Urban One, Inc. (formerly Radio One) is a Silver Spring, Maryland-based American media conglomerate. Founded in 1980 by Cathy Hughes, the company primarily operates media properties targeting African Americans. It is the largest African-American-owned broadcasting company in the United States, operating 55 radio stations and majority-owning the syndicator Reach Media, as well as its digital arm Interactive One, and the cable network TV One.

As of 2014, it was the ninth-highest-earning African-American-owned business in the United States.

History
Urban One was founded as Radio One in 1980 by Cathy Hughes, a then-recently divorced single mother, with the purchase of the Washington, D.C. radio station WOL-AM for $995,000. She changed the station's programming format from all-music to one that examined politics and culture from an African American perspective. Hughes purchased her second station, WMMJ in Washington, seven years later, which began to turn a profit once she converted it into a rhythm and blues station. This established Radio One's early strategy of purchasing small, underperforming radio stations in urban markets and refocusing them to serve the demographics of their communities.

After joining the company in 1985 and managing its day-to-day operations since 1993, Hughes's son, Alfred C. Liggins III, took over as CEO in 1997, with Hughes becoming the board's chairperson. Under the guidance of recently appointed CEO Liggins, Radio One went public on May 6, 1999, while continuing to be controlled by the family. The company's initial public offering was for 6.5 million shares at $24 per share. This made Hughes the first African American woman to chair a public company. As of 2010, Hughes and Liggins control 90% of Radio One's voting stock.

In 2001, Radio One expanded into 22 markets, with 18 million listeners, making it the nation's largest urban-market radio broadcasting company. Radio One reached a peak of owning 70 stations in 22 markets in 2007. It is the largest African-American-owned-and-operated broadcast company in the US.

In 1996, Radio One moved its corporate offices from Washington, D.C., to Lanham, Maryland. The company is now based in Silver Spring, Maryland.

On May 8, 2018, Radio One was renamed Urban One.

Launches

TV One
In January 2003, Radio One and Comcast announced an agreement to a joint venture to create a television network aimed at African Americans aged 25 to 54. On January 19, 2004, on Martin Luther King Jr.'s birthday, Radio One launched the television station TV One, airing African American entertainment, lifestyle and scripted shows, in 2.2 million households. Liggins serves as chairman of TV One. Brad Siegel was hired as president of TV One in late 2014.

By the end of 2007, TV One was in 42.2 million homes. In 2011, Comcast and NBCUniversal merged, with all Comcast cable holdings subsequently managed by NBCUniversal. Also in 2011, Radio One's ownership stake in TV One grew from 36.8% to 50.8%. In 2012, TV One changed its programming, doubling the amount of original content, and changing the logo, while keeping its target audience. As of 2012, TV One reaches 57.4 million US homes.

In March 2015, Radio One announced a deal to buy out Comcast's 47.9% share of TV One for $550 million. To assist with the deal, Radio One refinanced $119 million in outstanding debt, and will ultimately refinance debt totaling approximately $1 billion.

Interactive One
In 2008, Radio One launched Interactive One, also known as iOne, an online portfolio of digital brands, to complement their other media companies. Interactive One operates numerous digital brands, including NewsOne, The Urban Daily and Hello Beautiful. In 2011, Interactive One entered into an editorial and sales partnership with NBC News, aligning NewsOne with NBC's The Grio. As of 2013, Interactive One also has a partnership with Global Grind, a website founded by Russell Simmons and focused on pop culture and music content for African American and Hispanic audiences. In 2015, Interactive One launched HB Studios, a video production studio focused on creating scripted and unscripted programming about women and the diversity of their experiences. The programming will be featured on the iOne Women Channel, HelloBeautiful.com, YouTube and Facebook. NewsOne curates and retells news from other sources for an African-American audience.

As of 2011, Interactive was the largest network of owned and operated sites aimed at an African-American audience. As of 2014, Interactive One reaches over 18 million unique monthly users on its platform through over 80 national and local brands.

Acquisitions

Radio stations
In 1995, Radio One purchased WKYS-FM in Washington, D.C., for $34 million, and also entered the Atlanta market by purchasing WHAT-FM for $4.5 million. In 1997, the company entered the Philadelphia market with its purchase of WPHI-FM for $20 million. The company added numerous stations in the second half of the 1990s, including stations in Atlanta, St. Louis, Boston, Cleveland, Richmond, San Francisco, Detroit and Boston.

In 2000, Radio One purchased 12 stations for approximately $1.3 billion from Clear Channel, bringing Radio One into Los Angeles, Dallas, Houston and Miami, along with stations in Cleveland and Greenville, South Carolina. Soon after, Radio One added two more Dallas stations. In total, the company added 21 radio stations in 2000.

In February 2001, Radio One purchased rival company Blue Chip Broadcasting for approximately $135 million ($45 million cash with the remainder in stock). The purchase included 15 radio stations owned and operated by Cincinnati-based Blue Chip in Ohio, Minnesota and Kentucky. Earlier that month, Radio One had also purchased another Dallas radio station for $52.5 million. In June 2001, Radio One purchased Georgia radio station WPEZ-FM from US Broadcasting for $55 million.

In 2004, Radio One purchased KRTS-FM in Houston for approximately $72.5 million in cash, giving it three stations in the Houston market. Also in 2004, Radio One purchased country station WSNJ in Bridgeton, New Jersey, for $35 million. It had been on the air since 1937 and family-owned by the Ed and Katherine Bold family for over 50 years.

In 2011, Radio One changed stations in Houston, Cincinnati and Columbus, Ohio, from African American to general interest formats, due to low ratings. In May 2018, they purchased Washington, D.C. sports station "The Team 980" WTEM from Washington Commanders owner Dan Snyder's Red Zebra Broadcasting.

Reach Media
In November 2004, Radio One acquired a 53% stake in Reach Media, a Texas-based media company owned by radio host Tom Joyner, for $56.1 million in cash and stock. The deal also gave Radio One ownership rights to Joyner's syndicated Tom Joyner Morning Show, which was at the time airing on 115 stations to 8 million listeners; and news website BlackAmericaWeb.com, which had at the time approximately 800,000 members, giving Radio One its first strong Internet presence.

In 2005, Radio One teamed up with Reach Media to launch a new African-American-centered talk radio network, with programming hosted by the Reverend Al Sharpton, to be broadcast on up to 10 of Radio One's stations, as well as stations owned by other companies. In December 2012, under a new deal, Radio One increased its ownership stake in Reach Media to 80%. That same month, Radio One announced that the following year, it would merge its Syndication One urban programming lineup with Reach Media.

Print
In January 2007, Radio One purchased GIANT magazine for $275,000. In December 2009, the company suspended publication of the print version of the bi-monthly magazine, relaunching it online as GIANTLife.com. The website is a part of the Interactive One network.

Internet
In 2008, Radio One acquired social networking firm Community Connect, the parent company of BlackPlanet, AsianAvenue and MiGente, for $38 million. BlackPlanet at the time had 20 million members and was the nation's fourth-most visited social networking site.

Divestures
From 2006 through the beginning of 2008, Radio One sold nearly $150 million in assets, primarily underperforming radio stations. In 2007, Radio One sold ten stations to Main Line Broadcasting for approximately $76 million in cash. The stations sold were in Radio One's markets with the smallest African American populations. The sale decreased the number of Radio One's stations from 71 to 61.

Personalities
Radio One operates a variety of syndicated shows, with hosts including Rickey Smiley, Russ Parr, Erica Campbell, Bishop T. D. Jakes, D. L. Hughley and the Reverend Al Sharpton.

Stations
As of May 2018, Urban One's Radio One division operates 56 radio stations in 16 markets.

Milestones

See also

Inner City Broadcasting Corporation
TV One (U.S. TV network)
Cathy Hughes
Tom Joyner
List of U.S. states by African-American population
List of U.S. metropolitan areas with large African-American populations
List of U.S. communities with African American majority populations
List of African American neighborhoods
List of African-American newspapers and media outlets

References

External links
Radio One official website
TV One official website
Reach Media official website
Interactive One official website

 
1999 initial public offerings
American companies established in 1980
1980 establishments in Maryland
Companies based in Silver Spring, Maryland
Companies listed on the Nasdaq
Mass media companies established in 1980
Radio broadcasting companies of the United States
Black-owned companies of the United States